Giano may refer to:

Giano dell'Umbria, a comune in Umbria, central Italy
Giano Vetusto, a comune in Campania, southern Italy
The Italian name of the ancient god Janus (mythology)
The Italian name of Saturn's moon Janus (moon)